Coral Springs, officially the City of Coral Springs, is a city in Broward County, Florida, United States. As of the 2020 U.S. Census, the city had a population of 134,394. It is a principal city of the Miami metropolitan area, which was home to an estimated 6,012,331 people at the 2015 census.

The city, officially chartered on July 10, 1963, was master-planned and primarily developed by Coral Ridge Properties, Inc., which was acquired by Westinghouse in 1966. The city's name is derived from the company's name, and was selected after several earlier proposals had been considered and rejected. Despite the name, there are no natural springs in the city; Florida's springs are found in the central and northern portions of the state.

During the 1970s, 1980s, and 1990s the young city grew rapidly, adding over 35,000 residents each decade. Coral Springs has notably strict building codes, which are designed to maintain the city's distinctive aesthetic appeal. The city government's effective fiscal management has maintained high bond ratings, and the city has won accolades for its overall livability, its low crime rate, and its family-friendly orientation.

History
Coral Springs is a planned community. After several floods in 1947, Florida created the Central and Southern Florida Flood Control District (now the South Florida Water Management District). Canals and levees drained much of the area upon which Coral Springs was built. After the land was drained and cleared, most of the area was used as a bean farm. After Lyons' death in 1952, his heirs changed the focus to cattle.

A post-World War II real estate boom in South Florida attracted the interest of developers. Coral Ridge Properties, which already had several developments in Broward County, bought  of land from the Lyons family on December 14, 1961, for $1 million. The City of Coral Springs was chartered on July 10, 1963. Other names that were considered for the new city included "Curran Village," "Pompano Springs" and "Quartermore". By 1964, the company had developed a master plan for a city of 50,000 residents. On July 22, 1964, the first sale of 536 building lots netted $1.6 million. The landmark covered bridge was built that same year to promote the town. The first city government elections were held in 1967.

The city added 19 public schools, a regional mall, shopping centers and parks between 1970 and 2000 in response to rapid population growth. The construction of the Sawgrass Expressway in 1986 brought even more growth. A museum and a theater opened in the 1990s. The city reached residential build-out in 2003 and is very close to a commercial build-out.

Geography
Coral Springs is bordered by the cities of Parkland to the north, Coconut Creek to the east, Margate and North Lauderdale to the southeast and Tamarac to the south. To the west lie The Everglades.

Cityscape
Coral Springs is a sprawling city, with few tall or prominent structures. The tallest building in the city is a 12-story condominium (Country Club Tower), with five more buildings topping out at or near 10 stories, including four office buildings lining University Drive, one of the city's main roads. Buildings include the University Place at City Center, Coral Springs Executive Tower, Bank of America Center, and the Briarwood Towers. The Coral Springs Financial Plaza was the first major office building in the city; built in 1974 as the Bank of Coral Springs Building, it had 10 floors and 123,469 sq ft of office space; it was demolished in 2021. It opened as the Preferred Exchange Tower in 1985.

Coral Ridge Properties established strict landscaping and sign laws for the city—a question in the original version of Trivial Pursuit noted that the city hosted the first McDonald's without the distinctive Golden Arches sign. Restrictions on commercial signs, exterior paint colors, roofing materials, recreational vehicle and boat storage, and landscaping specifications are all strictly enforced; consequently, real estate values in the city are significantly higher than the county as a whole. In 2006, the median price of a single family home in Coral Springs was US$415,000, while the median price county-wide was US$323,000.

The city's downtown at the intersection of Sample Road and University Drive is the focus of an extensive redevelopment plan, estimated to cost close to US$700 million. The plan to revitalize the city's core started with an open-air shopping and entertainment center—"The Walk"—and progressed with the construction of "One Charter Place," opened April 2007. When completed, the redeveloped downtown area will offer office, retail, and a new government center, encompassing approximately three million square feet of floor space, in addition to approximately 1,000 residential units and a new hotel. The city's new $38 million city hall complex opened in January 2018, replacing the old building which was demolished later that year. The current downtown project in development, "Cornerstone Downtown Coral Springs", will feature two residential towers, a hotel, and a shopping, office and entertainment complex. The project began construction in 2022, following the demolition of the Coral Springs Financial Plaza at the end of 2021.

Coral Springs' largest park is Mullins Park (70 acres).

Climate
Coral Springs experiences a tropical rainforest climate (Köppen climate classification: Af). Average monthly rainfall is higher from April to September, with January and February as the driest months. The hurricane season is from June to November, with September as the month during which hurricanes are most likely to occur. The most powerful hurricane to strike Coral Springs since its incorporation was Wilma in 2005; the eye of the hurricane passed directly over the city. The city estimated that "as a result of the numerous hurricanes and storms that hit Coral Springs in 2004/2005, and especially as a result of Hurricane Wilma, the tree canopy coverage throughout the city has been reduced by about one third". A 2017 study put Coral Springs in fourth place for US cities most vulnerable to coastal flooding, with 115,000 residents living within FEMA's coastal floodplain.

Demographics

2020 census

As of the 2020 United States census, there were 134,394 people, 41,240 households, and 31,944 families residing in the city.

2010 census
As of 2010, there were 45,433 households, with 8.1% being vacant. As of 2000, 19,151 (43.2%) households had children under the age of 18 living with them, 26,875 (60.6%) were married couples living together, 7,663 (17.3%) had a female householder with no husband present, and 8,387 (18.9%) were non-families. 5,922 of all households (13.4%) were made up of individuals, and 1,408 (3.2%) had someone living alone who was 65 years of age or older. The average household size was 3.11 and the average family size was 3.45.

2000 census
In 2000, the city's age distribution was as follows: 38,335 residents (27.8%) under the age of 18, 14,560 (10.5%) from 18 to 24, 35,927 (26.0%) from 25 to 44, 39,821 (28.8%) from 45 to 64, and 9,358 (6.8%) who were 65 years of age or older. The median age was 35.7 years. For every 100 females, there were 93.5 males. For every 100 females age 18 and over, there were 85.7 males.

In 2000, the median income for a household in the city was US$69,808, and the median income for a family was $76,106. Males had a median income of $47,427 versus $34,920 for females. The per capita income for the city was $29,285. About 5.8% of families and 7.3% of the population were below the poverty line, including 11.1% of those under age 18 and 2.1% of those age 65 or over.

As of 2000, those who spoke only English at home accounted for 74.6% of residents. Other languages spoken at home included Spanish (15.0%), French Creole (2.2%), Portuguese (1.4%), French (1.1%), and Italian (0.8%.)

As of 2000, 2.1% of the city's population was from Haiti, 2.1% of the population was from Colombia, and 1.7% of the population was from Cuba.

Crime
Coral Springs enjoys a low crime rate, and was listed as 24th on the list of Florida's Safest Cities of 2020, by the independent review site SafeWise.

Economy

Employment
Of residents aged 16 years and over, 72.6% were in the labor force, 95% were employed and 5% unemployed. 39.5% of the population worked in management, professional, and related occupations;  32.9% in sales and office occupations; 12.8% in service occupations; 7.6% in construction, extraction, and maintenance occupations; 7% in production, transportation, and material moving occupations; and 0.1% in farming, fishing, and forestry occupations. The industries for which Coral Springs inhabitants worked were 17.6% educational, health and social services; 16.1% retail trade; 12.9% professional, scientific, management, administrative, and waste management services; 10.1% finance, insurance, real estate, and rental and leasing; 8.2% arts, entertainment, recreation, accommodation and food services; 7.0% manufacturing; 6.6% construction; 5.0% wholesale trade; 4% transportation, warehousing, and utilities;, 4.9% other services (except public administration); 3.7% information; 3.6% public administration; and 0.2% agriculture, forestry, fishing and hunting, and mining. 85.2% of workers worked in the private sector, 9.6% in government, 5% self-employed in unincorporated businesses, and 0.3% as unpaid family workers. The predominant method of commuting was driving alone in own car, accounting for 81.5% of commuting trips, followed by 11.2% who were carpoolers and 7.4% who used other methods or worked from home.

Credit ratings
As of November 2015, Fitch Ratings and Standard & Poor's gave the city's General Obligation bonds a bond credit rating of AAA, while Moody's rates the bonds AA1 after a downgrade in 2014. In its 2015 report, Fitch noted that "financial operations and reserve levels remain sound despite economic pressure that led to reserve draws in prior years."

Property taxes
As of 2017, the city's property tax rate of 5.87 mils (0.587% of assessed value per year) was the second lowest of large cities in Broward County. This rate is in addition to taxes due to Broward County, which has one of the highest property tax rates in the United States.

Major employers
Fiserv and Alliance Entertainment are the largest companies that have offices in the Corporate Park of Coral Springs. ABB Asea Brown Boveri and Royal Plastics Group have subsidiaries headquartered in the city.

Arts and culture

The Coral Springs Center for the Arts opened in 1990. Originally planned to be a gymnasium, a US$4 million renovation in 1996 added a 1,471 seat theater. The theater presents a program of popular shows and a yearly Broadway series. The  Coral Springs Museum of Art has a small number of exhibits and focuses on art classes and programs for the local community. There is currently one public library in the city, the Northwest Regional Library, affiliated with the county-wide Broward County Library system. The band New Found Glory hails from Coral Springs and was formed in the city.

The "Our Town" Festival has been continuously held since 1979, first sponsored by the Coral Springs Chamber of Commerce, and promoted by a non-profit organization since 1997. The event has a car show, a beauty pageant and carnival rides. The festival attracted more than 100,000 attendees in 1984, and the city estimated 200,000 visitors at the 1990 event. A parade was added to the event in 1985; since 1994, the parade has been run as a separate event during the Christmas season. Several other festivals are held throughout the year, such as "Fiesta Coral Springs", a Hispanic culture celebration, and the Festival of the Arts. At Coral Springs' 25th Anniversary Party, the Guinness World Record for "Largest Hamburger and Milkshake" was broken on July 10, 1988. The hamburger measured  in diameter and weighed 5063 pounds. The record stood for just over a year.

Coral Springs has two designated Florida Heritage sites. The Coral Springs Covered Bridge was the first structure built in the city, in 1964. The steel bridge,  in length, is the only covered bridge in Florida in the public right-of-way. The American Snuff Company provided two historical designs for the bridge sides, to make the structure appear aged. The Covered Bridge is depicted in Coral Springs' seal. The Museum of Coral Springs History started as a real estate office. Built outside the city limits, the single-room wooden structure was moved to Coral Springs and became its first administration building. Later it was used as the first police station, and as a Jaycees clubhouse; it was moved to the city dump in 1976, where it was used as a fire department training site for smoke drills. After it was inadvertently set on fire, public outcry prompted the building's relocation to Mullins Park for restoration. Since 1978, it has housed the city's history museum. The exhibits in the museum are historic items and city models.

Parks and recreation

Coral Springs is the current training home of the Florida Panthers NHL team, and has more than 25 amateur sports leagues. Coral Springs Youth Soccer has more than 3,000 players, playing for 284 teams in 20 separate leagues, divided by age group and sex. The Honda Classic golf tournament was played at the TPC at Eagle Trace from 1984 to 1991 and 1996 and then at the TPC at Heron Bay from 1997 to 2002. The short-lived professional soccer team Coral Springs Kicks (USISL) was based in the city.

The regional Sportsplex has a jogging path, an aquatic center, tennis courts, ice rinks and a dog park. The NHL's Florida Panthers conduct much of their training at the Saveology Iceplex, part of the Sportsplex. The International Tennis Championships—an ATP International Series men's tennis tournament was held at the Sportsplex from 1993 to 1998.

North Springs Little League, located in north Coral Springs, won the U.S. southeast regional senior league championship. Beyond this, they came out of the U.S. pool in the world series and played a game against Panama, which was broadcast on ESPN 2, in the championship game. North Springs little league lost the final game 5–4.

Government

Coral Springs uses the commission-manager form of municipal government, with all governmental powers resting in a legislative body called a commission. Coral Springs' commission is composed of five elected commissioners, one of whom is the mayor of the city and another of whom is the vice-mayor. The mayor and vice-mayor serve a two-year term; the commissioners serve four-year terms. The offices are non-partisan; no candidate is allowed to declare a party affiliation. The role of the commission is to pass ordinances and resolutions, adopt regulations, and appoint city officials, including the city manager. While the mayor serves as a presiding officer of the commission, the city manager is the administrative head of the municipal government, and is responsible for the administration of all departments. The city commission holds its regular meetings biweekly. The mayor is Scott J. Brook and the Vice Mayor is Joy Carter. The other commissioners are Shawn Cerra, Joshua Simmons and Larry Vignola. The City Manager is Mike Goodrum.

In 1965, Richard Vedilago became the city's first police chief and the lone officer of the Coral Springs Police Department; six years later, the department had grown to five officers. The department had 200 uniformed police officers in 2003, and 225 police officers in 2022. Gregory Tony, who was later appointed Sheriff of Broward County, was first employed as a police officer by the department, from 2005 to 2016, ultimately becoming a sergeant. Tony resigned from the department in 2016, amid tensions with his superiors regarding his sick leave usage.

Education 

According to the 2005 American Community Survey (conducted by the US Census Bureau), 39.2% of all adults over the age of 25 in Coral Springs have obtained a bachelor's degree, as compared to a national average of 27.2% of adults over 25, and 91.7% of Coral Springs residents over the age of 25 have earned a high school diploma, as compared to the national average of 84.2%.
Coral Springs had approximately 29,900 students in 2006. Three charter schools offer both primary and secondary education. Higher education is offered by Barry University, Nova Southeastern University and Broward College through a partnership with Coral Springs Charter School.

Public primary and secondary education is handled by the Broward County Public Schools District (BCPS). BCPS operates 3 high schools, 4 middle schools and 12 elementary schools within the city limits.  Ramblewood Elementary School received a Florida Sterling Award for its efforts in 2006. In 2008 the Florida Department of Education awarded all public schools in the city, with the exception of Coral Springs High School, "A" grades based on their performance on the Florida Comprehensive Assessment Test.  In 2008, Coral Springs High School received a "B," and in 2010 the school received its first "A." In 2009, all public elementary, middle, and charter schools in the city received "A's," except for Broward Community Charter School West, which received a "B."

North Broward Preparatory School maintains a satellite campus in Coral Springs that is currently not in use. The Coral Springs campus has boarding facilities, a playground, and a gymnasium. The school's main campus is in Coconut Creek.

Both Coral Springs Middle School and Forest Glen Middle School were recognized as a "five star" school as of 2017. About 25 schools in Broward County receive this honor. Two other elementary schools in Coral Springs received this rating as well: Maple Wood and Park Springs Elementary School.

Media

Coral Springs is a part of the Miami-Fort Lauderdale-Hollywood media market, which is the twelfth largest radio market and the seventeenth largest television market in the United States. Its primary daily newspapers are the South Florida-Sun Sentinel and The Miami Herald, and their Spanish-language counterparts El Sentinel and El Nuevo Herald.

The city is home to two local weekly newspapers, the Coral Springs Forum and Our Town News. Both publications focus on local issues and human interest stories.  The Coral Springs Forum was founded in 1971 by local high school students, the publication was sold after their graduation to local residents. Later the company became a subsidiary of the Tribune Company, the South Florida-Sun Sentinel publisher.

Infrastructure
In-city buses are provided free of charge by the local government. Regional transportation is provided by Broward County Transit. The only limited-access highway in Coral Springs is the Sawgrass Expressway (State Road 869), which borders the city on its northern and western edges. Major roads in the city include Atlantic Boulevard, University Drive, and Sample Road.

Coral Springs is served by Broward Health, and is home to the 200-bed Coral Springs Medical Center. The hospital received a 99 (out of 100) from the Joint Commission, ranking in the top 2% of over 9,000 surveyed hospitals.

Coral Springs' water supply comes from the Biscayne Aquifer, South Florida's primary source of drinking water. There are four different water districts within the city; the providers are the City of Coral Springs Water District, Coral Springs Improvement District, North Springs Improvement District and Royal Utilities. The South Florida Water Management District provides flood control protection and water supply protection to local residents, controls all water shortage management efforts and assigns water restrictions when necessary. Collection and disposal of city's trash or garbage is provided by Waste Pro. Electric power service is distributed by Florida Power & Light.

Notable people

 Eli Abaev (born 1998), American-Israeli basketball player for Hapoel Be'er Sheva in the Israeli Basketball Premier League
 Karamo Brown, actor,  television host, reality television
 Greg Cipes, actor
 Adam Cole, professional wrestler
 Brandon Duhaime, professional ice hockey player
 Matt Ford (born 1981), Major League Baseball pitcher
 Robert Levinson, the longest-held hostage in U.S. history
 Jonathan Lovitz, advocate and politician
 Elliott Maddox (born 1947), Major League Baseball outfielder
 Jared Moskowitz (born 1980), member-elect to the US House of Representatives 
Andrew Pollack (born 1966), author, school safety activist, and entrepreneur
 Stacy Ritter (born 1960), president and CEO of the Greater Fort Lauderdale Convention & Visitors Bureau, former  Broward County Commissioner and member of the Florida House of Representatives
 Laine Selwyn born 1981, professional women's basketball player with Maccabi Ashdod
 Lexi Thompson, professional golfer
 Todd Weiner, NFL offensive tackle
 Jeordie White, musician

A number of professional athletes are from Coral Springs: MLS soccer player Stephen Herdsman, Latvian Higher League soccer player Nate Weiss, NFL football players Dan Morgan, Todd Weiner, Darius Butler, Steve Hutchinson, Cody Brown and Sam Young, and Major League Baseball player Anthony Rizzo of the New York Yankees.

Pro golfer Lexi Thompson, youngest winner ever of a LPGA tour event at 16, was born in Coral Springs.

Several athletes who participated in the 2008 Olympic Games in Beijing are from or currently living in Coral Springs, including beach volleyball gold medalist Misty May-Treanor, swimming silver medalist Dara Torres (who resides in neighboring Parkland, Florida, but trains in Coral Springs), and track-and-field bronze medalist Walter Dix.

Awards and rankings
In 2007, Coral Springs became the first state or local government in the nation to receive the Malcolm Baldrige National Quality Award.

The city has received the Florida Sterling Award for excellence in administration twice, in 1997 and 2003.

Sister cities
Coral Springs is a sister city of Paraíso, Costa Rica.

See also

Our Lady of Health Syro-Malabar Catholic Church of Miami (1986) mission, (2006) parish

Notes

References

Further reading

External links

 

 
Cities in Broward County, Florida
Planned cities in the United States
Populated places established in 1963
Cities in Florida
Planned communities in Florida
1963 establishments in Florida